Manu is a term found as various meanings in Hinduism. In early texts, it refers to the archetypal man, or to the first man (progenitor of humanity). The Sanskrit term for 'human', मानव (IAST: mānava) means 'of Manu' or 'children of Manu'. In later texts, Manu is the title or name of fourteen rulers of earth, or alternatively as the head of dynasties that begin with each cyclic kalpa (aeon) when the universe is born anew. The title of the text Manusmriti uses this term as a prefix, but refers to the first Manu – Svayambhuva, the spiritual son of Brahma. In the Hindu cosmology, each kalpa consists of fourteen Manvantaras, and each Manvantara is headed by a different Manu. The current universe, is asserted to be ruled by the 7th Manu named Vaivasvata. Vaivasvata was the king of Dravida before the great flood. He was warned of the flood by the Matsya (fish) avatar of Vishnu, and built a boat that carried the Vedas, Manu's family and the seven sages to safety, helped by Matsya. The tale is repeated with variations in other texts, including the Mahabharata and a few other Puranas. It is similar to other floods  such as those associated with Gilgamesh and Noah.

Fourteen Manus

There are fourteen Manus that rule in succession during each Kalpa (day of Brahma). The current Kalpa has the following Manus:

Swayambhuva Manu
The first Manu. He was the mind born son of the god Brahma, and husband of Shatarupa. He had three daughters, namely Akuti, Devahuti and Prasuti. Devahuti was given in marriage to Prajapati Kardama and she gave birth to nine daughters, and a single son named Kapila. Prasuti gave birth to several daughters including Khyati, Anasuya amongst many, and Akuti gave birth to one son named Yajna and one daughter. Both Kapila and Yajna, who were sons of Devahuti and Akuti respectively, were incarnations of Vishnu. Svayambhuva Manu, along with his wife, Satarupa, went into the forest to practice austerities on the bank of the River Sunanda. At some point of time, Rakshasas attacked them, but Yajna, accompanied by his sons, the demigods, swiftly killed them. Then Yajna personally took the post of Indra, the King of the heavenly planets. Svayambhuva Manu's abode is Brahmavarta, with the town of Barhismati as the capital. Barhismati was formed when Visnu in his cosmic boar form (Varaha) shook his body, there fell large hair, which turned into the town. The small hairs which fell turned into kusa and kasa grass.

In this Manvantara, the Saptarshis were Marichi, Atri, Angiras, Pulaha, Kratu, Pulastya, and Vashishtha.
In Svayambhuva-manvantara, Lord Vishnu's avatar was called Yajna.

Swarochisha Manu
The Saptarshis were Urjastambha, Agni, Prana, Danti, Rishabha, Nischara, and Charvarivan.
In Svarocisha-manvantara, Lord Vishnu's avatar was called Vibhu.

The second Manu, whose name was Svarocisha, was the son of Agni, and His sons were headed by Dyumat, Sushena and Rochishmat. He invented clothing and made it for mankind. At his deathbed, Devala Rishi was born from Shiva's third eye to succeed Svarochisa Manu in making clothes for mankind. and In the age of this Manu, Rochana became Indra, the ruler of the heavenly planets, and there were many demigods, headed by Tushita. There were also many saintly persons, such as Urjastambha. Among them was Vedasira, whose wife, Tushita, gave birth to Vibhu. Vibhu was the incarnation of Vishnu for this Manvantara. He remained a Brahmachari all his life and never married. He instructed eighty-eight thousand dridha-vratas, or saintly persons, on sense-control and austerity.

Uttama Manu
The Saptarshis for this Manvantara were Kaukundihi, Kurundi, Dalaya, Sankha, Pravahita, Mita, and Sammita.
In Uttama-manvantara, Lord Vishnu's avatar was called Satyasena.

Uttama, the son of Priyavrata, was the third Manu. Among his sons were Pavana, Srinjaya and Yajnahotra. During the reign of this Manu, the sons of Vashista, headed by Pramada, became the seven saintly persons. The Satyas, Devasrutas and Bhadras became the demigods, and Satyajit became Indra. From the womb of Sunrita, the wife of Dharma, the Supreme Lord Narayana appeared as Satyasena, and killed all the evil Rakshasas who created havoc in all the worlds, along with Satyajit, who was Indra at that time.

Tapasa/Tamasa Manu
Saptarshis list: Jyotirdhama, Prithu, Kavya, Chaitra, Agni, Vanaka, and Pivara.
In Tapasa-manvantara, Lord Vishnu's avatar was called Hari.

Tapasa/Tamasa, the brother of the third Manu, was the fourth Manu, and he had ten sons, including Prithu, Khyati, Nara and Ketu. During his reign, the Satyakas, Haris, Viras and others were demigods, the seven great saints were headed by Jyotirdhama, and Trisikha became Indra. Harimedha begot a son named Hari, who was the incarnation of Vishnu for this Manvantara, by his wife Harini. Hari was born to liberate the devotee Gajendra.

Raivata Manu
Saptarshis list: Hirannyaroma, Vedasrí, Urddhabahu, Vedabahu, Sudhaman, Parjanya, and Mahámuni.
In Raivata-manvantara, Lord Vishnu's avatar was called Vaikuntha, not to be confused with Vishnu's divine realm, of the same name.

Vaikuntha came as Raivata Manu, the twin brother of Tamasa. His sons were headed by Arjuna, Bali and Vindhya. Among the demigods were the Bhutarayas, and among the seven brahmanas who occupied the seven planets were Hiranyaroma, Vedasira and Urdhvabahu.

Chakshusha Manu

Saptarshis list: Sumedhas, Virajas, Havishmat, Uttama, Madhu, Abhináman, and Sahishnnu.
In Chakshusha-manvantara, Lord Vishnu's avatar was called Ajita.

Ajita came as Chakshsusa Manu, the son of the demigod Chakshu. He had many sons, headed by Puru, Purusa and Sudyumna. During the reign of Chakshusa Manu, the King of heaven was known as Mantradruma. Among the demigods were the Apyas, and among the great sages were Havisman and Viraka. He had a daughter named Jyothismati, who wished for the most powerful being as her husband. When asking Indra, the king of gods, Indra replied that his storms could be pushed away by Vayu. Vayu said that his winds could not push away the earth, and thus Bhumavat, the male personification of the earth, was stronger. Bhumavat said that Adishesha, who holds both Vishnu and the earth, is the strongest. Adishehs told Manu and Jyothishmati that his second avatar on earth would be stronger than himself, and thus Jyothishmati was reborn as Revati to marry that avatar, Krishna's brother Balarama.

Vaivasvata Manu
The Seventh Manu  
Saptarshis list: Marichi, Atri, Angiras, Pulaha, Kratu, Pulastya, and Vashishtha , and other likeJamadagni, Kashyapa, Gautama, Vishvamitra, Bharadvaja. During Vaivasvata-manvantara, Lord Vishnu's avatar is called Matsya.

The seventh Manu, who is the son of Vivasvan, is known as Sraddhadeva (or satyavrata) or Vaivasvat (son of Vivasvan). He has ten sons, named Ikshvaku, Nabhaga, Dhrsta, Saryati, Narisyanta, Dista (Nabhanedista), Tarusa (Karusha), Prsadhra, Vasuman (Pramshu) and Ila (Sudyumna). In this manvantara, or reign of Manu, among the demigods are the Adityas, Vasus, Rudras, Visvedevas, Maruts, Asvini-kumaras and Rbhus. The king of heaven, Indra, is known as Purandara, and the seven sages are known as 
Jamadagni, Kashyapa, Atri, Vashista, Gautama, Agastya and Bharadwaja

Surya Savarni Manu
Saptarshis list: Diptimat, Galava, Parasurama, Kripa, Drauni or Ashwatthama, Vyasa, and Rishyasringa. In Savarnya-manvantara, Lord Vishnu's avatar will be called Sarvabhauma.

In the period of the eighth Manu, the Manu is Surya Savarnika Manu. He is the son of Surya by his second wife, Chhaya. He is thus the half-brother to Shraddhadeva Manu. His sons are headed by Nirmoka, and among the demigods are the Sutapas. Bali, the son of Virochana, is Indra, and Galava and Parasurama are among the seven sages. In the age of this Manu, Lord Vishnu's avatar will be called Sarvabhauma, the son of Devaguhya.

Daksa Savarni Manu
Saptarshis list: Savana, Dyutimat, Bhavya, Vasu, Medhatithi, Jyotishmán, and Satya.
In Daksha-savarnya-manvantara, Lord Vishnu's avatar will be called Rishabha.

The ninth Manu is Daksha-savarni. He is the son of Lord Varuna. His sons are headed by Bhutaketu, and among the demigods are the Maricigarbhas. Adbhuta is Indra, and among the seven sages is Dyutiman. Rishabha would be born of Ayushman and Ambudhara...

Brahma Savarni Manu
Saptarshis list: Havishmán, Sukriti, Satya, Apámmúrtti, Nábhága, Apratimaujas, and Satyaket.
In Brahma-savarnya-manvantara, Lord Vishnu's avatar will be called Vishvaksena.

In the period of the tenth Manu, the Manu is Brahma-savarni. He is the son of Upsaloka( The son of lord Kartikeya) Among his sons is Bhurishena, and the seven sages are Havishman and others. Among the demigods are the Suvasanas, and Sambhu is Indra. Vishvaksena would be a friend of Sambhu and will be born from the womb of Vishuci in the house of a brahmana named Visvasrashta.

Dharma Savarni Manu
Saptarshis list: Niśchara, Agnitejas, Vapushmán, Vishńu, Áruni, Havishmán, and Anagha.
In Dharma-savarnya-manvantara, Lord Vishnu's avatar will be called Dharmasetu.

In the period of the eleventh Manu, the Manu is Dharma-savarni, the son of Satya Yuga. He has ten sons, headed by Satyadharma. Among the demigods are the Vihangamas, Indra is known as Vaidhrita, and the seven sages are Aruna and others. Dharmasetu will be born of Vaidhrita and Aryaka.

Rudra Savarni Manu
Saptarshis list: Tapaswí, Sutapas, Tapomúrtti, Taporati, Tapodhriti, Tapodyuti, and Tapodhan.
In Rudra-savarnya-manvantara, Lord Vishnu's avatar will be called Sudhama.

In the period of the twelfth Manu, the Manu is Rudra-savarni, whose sons are headed by Devavan. The demigods are the Haritas and others, Indra is Ritadhama, and the seven sages are Tapomurti and others. Sudhama, or Svadhama, who will be born from the womb of Sunrita, wife of a Satyasaha.

According to Manava Purana, Rudra Savarni Manu is the son of Shiva and Parvati.

Raucya or Deva Savarni Manu
Saptarshis list: Nirmoha, Tatwadersín, Nishprakampa, Nirutsuka, Dhritimat, Avyaya, and Sutapas.
In Deva-savarnya-manvantara, Lord Vishnu's avatar will be called Yogeshwara.

In the period of the thirteenth Manu, the Manu is Deva-savarni. Among his sons is Chitrasena, the demigods are the Sukarmas and others, Indra is Divaspati, and Nirmoka is among the sages. Yogeshwara will be born of Devahotra and Brihati.

Indra Savarni Manu
Saptarshis list: Agnibáhu, Śuchi, Śhukra, Magadhá, Gridhra, Yukta, and Ajita.
In Indra-savarnya-manvantara, Lord Vishnu's avatar will be called Brihadbhanu.

In the period of the fourteenth Manu, the Manu is Indra-savarni. Among his sons are Uru and Gambhira, the demigods are the Pavitras and others, Indra is Suci, and among the sages are Agni and Bahu. Brihadbhanu will be born of Satrayana from the womb of Vitana.

Almost all literature refers to the first 9 Manus with the same names but there is a lot of disagreement on names after that, although all of them agree with a total of 14.

Bibliography

The texts ascribed to the Svayambhuva Manu include Manava Grihyasutra, Manava Sulbasutra and Manava Dharmashastra (Manusmṛti or "rules of Manu").

In Jainism

Jain theology mentions the 14th patriarch named Nabhiraja, mentioning him also as Manu. This, state scholars, links ancient Jain tradition to Hindu legends, because the 14 patriarchs in Jain tradition are similar to the 14 Manus in Hindu legends. The Manu of Jainism is the father of 1st Tirthankara Rishabhanatha (Adinatha). This ancient story is significant as it includes one of earliest mentions of ikshu (sugarcane) processing.

See also
 Adam
 Proto-Indo-European religion, §Brothers
 Minos, king of Crete, son of Zeus and Europa.
 Manu and Yemo
 Mannus, progenitor of humanity in Germanic mythology according to Tacitus.
 Manes, king of Lydia
 Nu'u, Hawaiian mythological character who built an ark and escaped a Great Flood.
 Nüwa, goddess in Chinese mythology best known for creating mankind.
 Noah
 Ziusudra, hero of the Sumerian flood epic
 Atra-Hasis

References

Sources

External links
 Manu in Vedic scripture

Characters in Hindu mythology
Hindu law jurists
Mythological kings
Legendary progenitors
Flood myths
Water and Hinduism
Mythological first humans